Portbury Shipyard railway station served the village of Easton in Gordano, North Somerset, England, from 1918 to 1923 on the Portishead Railway.

History
The station was opened on 16 September 1918 by the Great Western Railway. It closed on 26 March 1923.

References

Disused railway stations in Somerset
Former Great Western Railway stations
Railway stations in Great Britain opened in 1918
Railway stations in Great Britain closed in 1923
1918 establishments in England
1923 disestablishments in England